Jackson Stitt Wilson (March 19, 1868 – August 28, 1942) was a Canadian-born American politician. He was a Christian socialist and suffragist, and held Georgist economic views. A member of the Socialist Party of America,  Wilson was the mayor of Berkeley, California from 1911 to 1913. He ran for Congress on a socialist platform, receiving 40 percent of the votes cast, but was defeated by the incumbent Republican Congressman.

Biography

Early years

J. Stitt Wilson was born in the small town of Auburn, Ontario in Southwestern Ontario on March 19, 1868, the son of Methodist parents.  He emigrated to the U.S. in 1888, settling in Evanston, Illinois, where he attended Northwestern University. After graduation he worked as a schoolmaster and for a law firm. Wilson later decided to enter the Methodist ministry, enrolling at the theological seminary at Northwestern. Following completion of his schooling, Wilson worked for the next four years as a Methodist pastor and social worker in nearby Chicago. He later recalled that the experience of these four years were "to me a school out of which I came — a Socialist."

He later recalled:

Political activity
Wilson first became involved in the organized socialist movement late in the 1890s as an active member of the Brotherhood of the Cooperative Commonwealth, an organization which sought to establish socialist colonies in the new state of Washington with a view to taking over the state government and establishing a cooperative rather than profit-driven economy. Wilson continued to live in Chicago but served as one of eight official "lecturers" for the organization.

Wilson was inspired by what he called "the social and economic significance of the Teachings of Jesus":

The Sermon on the Mount I saw was a code of social duties, so to speak, a revelation of the fundamental principles of Social Justice and human fellow ship for this our everyday world. Such a passage as that beginning with the phrase, "No man can serve two masters," is nothing short of a brief but comprehensive Social Program. It is almost impossible to find in the whole Sermon on the Mount anything that could give an ecclesiastical or theological colour to these sayings. They are ethical, moral, social.

From 1907, Wilson was a contributing editor to The Christian Socialist [Chicago], a weekly newspaper that unified the Christian socialist wing of the Socialist Party of America.

Wilson was a delegate from California to the 1904, 1910, and 1912 national conventions of the Socialist Party. At that 1912 gathering, Wilson joined with Ernest Untermann, Joshua Wanhope, and Robert Hunter as a majority of the Committee on Immigration in offering a resolution on immigration which was pro-exclusionary, backing the American Federation of Labor in its desire to stop manufacturers from importing cheap, non-union labor from the Far East. This proposal, primarily written by Untermann and Wanhope, was effectively killed by the convention on a motion by Charles Solomon of New York not to receive the committee's report, but rather to hold the matter open for investigation and decision by the next convention.

Before he became mayor of Berkeley, Wilson ran for governor of California in 1910 on the Socialist ticket and received 12% of the votes cast. Wilson was elected mayor of Berkeley in 1911 to a two-year term but declined to run for re-election. In 1912, he ran for Congress as a Socialist and received 26,234 votes, 40% of the votes cast, but was defeated by the incumbent Republican Joseph R. Knowland. He was elected to the governing National Executive Committee of the Socialist Party in 1914.

Wilson believed that there was an "impending social revolution" in the economic relations of man marked by the principle of "social ownership by the whole people of the basic equipment of land and machinery." Wilson asserted in a 1911 pamphlet that this social revolution was "now on" and declared

If God is ever to wipe away the tears from the face of man this age-long wrong [capitalism] must be overthrown. If the mission of Jesus is ever to get the upper hand in human affairs, the social revolution must come to pass. There is no more good news to the poor unless there is the message and the task to abolish this age-long night of poverty. There is no deliverance for captives unless this social captivity is ended. There is no setting at liberty the people that are bruised unless this age-long bruising machinery is stopped. If we are ever to call the poor and the maimed and the halt to the banquet of creation, the program of the revolution must be inaugurated. The Heavenly Father may know we have need of all these things, and He may have provided for these needs in the limitless resources of nature, but we never can have them for the people except by seeking the kingdom of social justice and human brotherhood — which is the Kingdom of God — which is the social vision of the social revolution.

Wilson was a strong supporter of the "single tax" movement begun by Henry George, arguing that land gained its value through the collective activity of humanity, not by the individual owner, and that the city, "the Social Mother in whose household we all live" should support itself by taxing this collectively created value. He gained the support of the League of California Municipalities and lead unsuccessful initiative campaigns in 1912 and 1914 to change the California constitution to allow local governments "home rule" in taxation so that they could choose to tax land separately from buildings and personal property.

Not sharing the organization's staunch anti-militarist perspective, Wilson withdrew from the Socialist Party at the outbreak of World War I. He was again writing for the party press by 1922, however.

During the Great Depression, Wilson was appointed to the California State Relief Commission. In 1932, he was the Socialist candidate for the Congressional district which included Berkeley (7th), and in 1936 and 1940, he was a delegate to the Democratic Party convention.

Death and legacy
Wilson was married to Emma Agnew and had four children. His two sons were William Gladstone and Melnotte. His two daughters, Gladys Viola and Violette, both went into show business. Gladys took the stage name Viola Barry and starred in a series of silent films during the decade of the 1910s. Violette married actor and movie director Irving Pichel.

Wilson died in Berkeley, California, on August 28, 1942.

Works
 "Socialism in London" (Reprint from The Social Crusader.) Appeal to Reason [Girard, KS], whole no. 179 (May 6, 1899), pg. 2.
 The Message of Socialism to the Church: An Address Delivered Before the Bay Association of Congregational Churches and Ministers, Oakland, September 13, 1904. Berkeley, CA: J. Stitt Wilson, 1904. *
 The Tragic Game of Capitalism: Being an Open Letter to the People of the United States Concerning the Injustice of the Present Social Order. Berkeley, CA: J. Stitt Wilson, 1906.
 The Message of Jesus to Our Times: An Interpretation. Berkeley, CA: J. Stitt Wilson, n.d. [1907?].
 The Impending Social Revolution, or, The Trust Problem Solved. Berkeley, CA: The Social Crusade, 1911. *
 The Hebrew Prophets and the Social Revolution. Huddersfield [England]: J. Stitt Wilson, 1909. *
 The Messiah Cometh: Riding Upon the Ass of Economics. Berkeley, CA: J. Stitt Wilson, n.d. *
 The Bible Argument for Socialism. Berkeley, CA: J. Stitt Wilson, 1911." *
 How I Became a Socialist. Berkeley, CA: J. Stitt Wilson, 1911. *
 How I Became a Socialist, Part Two. Berkeley, CA: J. Stitt Wilson, 1911. *
 The Kingdom of God and Socialism. Berkeley, CA: J. Stitt Wilson, 1911. *
 Moses: The Greatest of Labour Leaders. Huddersfield, England, J. Stitt Wilson, 1909. *
 "The Story of a Socialist Mayor," The Western Comrade, vol. 1, no. 06 (Sept. 1913), pp. 186-187, 196.
 The Harlots and the Pharisees, or, The Barbary Coast in a Barbarous Land ; also, The Story of a Socialist Mayor; Letter Declining Mayoralty Nomination. Berkeley, CA: J. Stitt Wilson, 1913.
 The Three Great Hypnotisms. Westwood, MA: The Ariel Press, n.d. [191-?].
 Constructive Christian Democracy: An Outline of Fundamentals. Berkeley, CA: J. Stitt Wilson, 1922.
 The Militant Church and Property; The Militant Church and Public Opinion. Berkeley, CA: J. Stitt Wilson, n.d. [1923?]
 The Christ-Spirit in the Animal World. Berkeley, CA: J. Stitt Wilson, 1925.

Pamphlets denoted with (*) included in J. Stitt Wilson, How I Became a Socialist and Other Papers, Berkeley, CA: J. Stitt Wilson, 1912.

See also
 List of Socialist Party Mayors (United States)
 List of elected socialist mayors in the United States

Footnotes

Further reading
 Douglas Firth Anderson, "The Reverend J. Stitt Wilson and Christian Socialism in California", pp. 375–400 in Carl Guarneri, David Alvarez (eds.), Religion and Society in the American West: Historical Essays. University Press of America, NY, 1987.
 Douglas Firth Anderson, "'An Active and Unceasing Campaign of Social Education': J. Stitt Wilson and Herronite Socialist Christianity," in Jacob H. Dorn (ed.), Socialism and Christianity in Early 20th Century America. Westport, CT: Greenwood Press, 1998; pp. 41–64.
 Stephen Barton, "Berkeley Mayor J. Stitt Wilson: Christian Socialist, Georgist, Feminist," American Journal of Economics and Sociology, vol. 75, no. 1 (January, 2016), pp. 193–216.
 Stephen Barton, "J. Stitt Wilson: Berkeley's Socialist Mayor," Exactly Opposite, vol. 29, no. 2 (Summer 2011), pp. 1, 3–6.
 Stephen Barton, "'This Social Mother in Whose Household We All Live': Berkeley Mayor J. Stitt Wilson's Early Twentieth Century Socialist Feminism", Journal of the Gilded Age and Progressive Era, vol. 13 (2014), pp. 532–563.
 Stephen E. Barton, J. Stitt Wilson: Socialist, Christian, Mayor of Berkeley. Berkeley, CA: Berkeley Historical Society, 2021.
 Ira Brown Cross, "Socialism in California Municipalities", National Municipal Review, Volume 1 (1912) pp. 611–619.
 Michael Hanika, J. Stitt Wilson: California Socialist. MA Thesis. University of California, Hayward, 1972.
 Adam Hull Shirk, "An Impression of J. Stitt Wilson," The Northern Crown, vol. 4, no. 11 (June 1911).
 Gary Scott Smith, The Search for Social Salvation: Social Christianity and America, 1880-1925. Lanham, MD: Rowman and Littlefield, 2000.

External links
 Political Graveyard Biography
 Viola Barry
 Berkeley Public Library

1868 births
1942 deaths
American anti-capitalists
American Christian socialists
American Methodist clergy
Canadian anti-capitalists
Canadian Christian socialists
Canadian clergy
Canadian emigrants to the United States
Canadian Methodists
Georgists
Mayors of Berkeley, California
Methodist socialists
Northwestern University alumni
Socialist Party of America politicians from California